Soil Research is an international peer-reviewed scientific journal published by CSIRO Publishing. It aims to rapidly publish high-quality, novel research about fundamental and applied aspects of soil science. As well as publishing in traditional aspects of soil biology, soil physics and soil chemistry across terrestrial ecosystems, the journal also publishes manuscripts dealing with wider interactions of soils with the environment.

It was established in 1963 as the Australian Journal of Soil Research and obtained its current title in 2011.

The current Editors-in-Chief are Balwant Singh (University of Sydney) and Mark Tibbett (University of Reading).

Abstracting and indexing 
The journal is abstracted and indexed in ABOA/Streamline, Elsevier BIOBASE, BIOSIS, CAB Abstracts, Chemical Abstracts, Current Contents (Agriculture, Biology & Environmental Sciences), Science Citation Index, Scopus and TEEAL.

Impact factor 
According to the Journal Citation Reports, the journal has a 2015 impact factor of 1.611.

References

External links 
 

Publications established in 1963
Agricultural journals
Soil science journals
CSIRO Publishing academic journals
English-language journals
8 times per year journals